Lee Evans (born 18 October 1988, from Kempsford) is an English professional darts player who currently playing in Professional Darts Corporation events.

Career

2015
Evans failed to get a PDC Tour Card for 2015 after he could not get past the last 64 on any of the four days of Q School, but he did qualify for the 2015 UK Open, where he defeated Nick Fulwell and Ronny Huybrechts, before losing 9–4 to Vincent van der Voort in the third round, after being 4–1 ahead. Evans won the Gosport Open by beating Richard Kirby 4–1. In October he played in the European Darts Grand Prix and knocked out Jyhan Artut 6–3 and Terry Jenkins 6–4 to reach the last 16 of a PDC event for the first time, where he lost 6–3 to Ian White.

Evans began 2016 brightly by twice reaching the last 16 in the UK Open Qualifiers. He entered the main event at the second round stage and eliminated Rowby-John Rodriguez 6–2, but then lost 9–7 to Jamie Caven. He won through to the final of the 9th Challenge Tour event and was beaten 5–4 by Matt Padgett. He reached the last 16 of a main tour event for the third time this year at the 10th Players Championship with wins over Dave Ladley, Vincent van der Voort and Mervyn King, but was whitewashed 6–0 by Dave Chisnall.

Personal life
Evans was a bricklayer and labourer to his father steve before he quit in 2015 to concentrate on his darts career.

References

External links

1988 births
Living people
English darts players
Sportspeople from Gloucestershire
Professional Darts Corporation current tour card holders